Gilles Eyquem (born May 30, 1959 in Bordeaux, France) is a former professional footballer. He played as a central defender and is currently manager of the France under-16 national team.

External links
Gilles Eyquem profile at chamoisfc79.fr

1959 births
Living people
French footballers
French football managers
Association football defenders
FC Girondins de Bordeaux players
En Avant Guingamp players
AS Cannes players
Chamois Niortais F.C. players
Angers SCO players
AS Cherbourg Football players
Ligue 1 players
Ligue 2 players